Meraas is a privately held holding company headquartered in Dubai with operations and assets in the United Arab Emirates. As of 2020, Meraas was reportedly due to become a subsidiary of Dubai Holding.

History
Since its founding in 2007, the Dubai-based conglomerate has launched several projects in multiple sectors including real estate, retail, hospitality, food and beverage, leisure and entertainment and healthcare. Sheikh Ahmed bin Saeed Al Maktoum serves as the Group Chairman of Meraas.

The Meraas real estate portfolio comprises property development sales and asset management across Dubai. Projects include Port de La Mer, Central Park at City Walk, Cherrywoods, Bluewaters Residences, Bvlgari Residences, Nikki Beach Residences and Villa Amalfi.

In 2019 Meraas launched its latest destination, Dubai Harbour. When complete, the development will become the Middle East's first yachting community hub and the largest marina in the Middle East and North Africa, comprising a total of 1,100 berths. It is also due to be home to the 135-metre Dubai Lighthouse.

In 2021, Meraas unveiled Ain Dubai. Standing at more than 250-metres tall and has over 9,000 tonnes of steel, the Ain Dubai is located on the Bluewaters island destination. During construction, the structure was described as the "largest Ferris wheel in the world".

Lines of business
The firm's real estate division comprises property development sales and asset management. Projects include City Walk, Bluewaters Island, Jumeira Bay, Pearl Jumeira, La Mer, and Dubai Harbour. In 2019, Meraas launched its first townhouse community in Dubai, Cherrywoods.

The firm's "Leisure & Entertainment" division operates entertainment destinations and venues, including the Dubai Safari. Other projects include The Green Planet in City Walk, a destination that recreates a tropical forest, Hub Zero in City Walk, an indoor entertainment centre comprising rides and virtual reality experiences, Hawa Hawa in La Mer, an inflatable playground, and Ain Dubai in Bluewaters, the world's tallest observation wheel.

The hospitality division handles hotel operations for the group and has partnered with hotel operators such as Bvlgari Hotels and Resorts, Jumeirah, Marriott, Nikki Beach Hotels and Resorts, Caesars Entertainment.  Meraas Hospitality properties include La Ville Hotel & Suites, Caesars Palace Bluewaters Dubai, Caesars Resort Bluewaters Dubai, Zabeel House, Zabeel House MINI and Al Seef Hotel.

Meraas also has a retail division, food and beverage division, and a healthcare division. The latter include the Valiant Clinic in City Walk.

Real estate
Meraas’ real estate division comprises property development, sales and asset management across Dubai.

Bluewaters Residences

Bluewaters Residences is a collection of one to four-bedroom apartments, penthouses and townhouses located on the man-made island of Bluewaters. The properties are set over a podium that is designed to capture views of the Persian Gulf. Handover to first residents started in February 2019.

Bvlgari Residences

Bvlgari Residences is located in Jumeira Bay and comprises one to three-bedroom apartments, four-bedroom penthouses and three to six-bedroom mansions. The development has been designed by Italian architect Antonio Citterio and is one of only six Bvlgari branded residences globally. First handover to residents was announced in February 2018.

Central Park at City Walk

Central Park at City Walk is a residential neighbourhood which will surround a 40,000 square metre private park in the heart of Dubai. The one to four-bedroom apartments will offer residents views of the park as well as of Dubai's skyline.

Nikki Beach Residences

Nikki Beach Residences are a set of branded homes adjacent to Nikki Beach Resort & Spa Dubai in Pearl Jumeira. The development includes one to four-bedroom apartments, penthouses and apartment townhouses.  Handover to residents started in March 2018.

The company also owns a number of real estate plots in Dubai, including Jebel Ali Hills, Jebel Ali Industrial Development, Jumeira Bay, La Mer, Nad Al Sheba Gardens, Al Mamzar Front, Al Satwa, Al Warsan First Redevelopment and Al Warsan Industrial Plot.

Destinations
Al Seef

Al Seef is a 1.8-kilometre waterfront promenade. It has a marina with 56 berths for private yachts.

Bluewaters

Bluewaters features residential, retail and hospitality zones bordered by walkways and a private beach.  The destination is home to Ain Dubai, the world's tallest and largest observation wheel that stands at a height of 250+ metres. 
 
Boxpark

In February 2015 Meraas launched Boxpark, a destination spanning across 1.2-kilometres located on Al Wasl road.

City Walk

In December 2013, Meraas launched City Walk, an open-air lifestyle destination, spanning an area of more than 10 million square feet.

Dubai Harbour

In January 2017, His Highness Shaikh Mohammed bin Rashid Al Maktoum unveiled Dubai Harbour, with berths for yachts and views of some of Dubai's landmarks.

Kite Beach

Spanning over 1.1 million square feet, Kite Beach features a 14-kilometre running track as well as a retail outlets and eateries. The destination hosts community art fairs and markets, sports tournaments and races.

La Mer

La Mer, launched in October 2017, is a beachfront destination located on 2.5-kilometres of beach.

Last Exit

Last Exit is a themed food truck concept offering "gourmet" street food.

Pearl Jumeira

Pearl Jumeira is home to Nikki Beach Resort and Spa Dubai that opened its doors on December 20 and features 132 keys including 117 rooms and suites, 15 villas and 63 private residences.

The Outlet Village

Launched in September 2016, The Outlet Village is an indoor retail destination.

Enterprises
The enterprise division is responsible for the management of shareholders’ investments, joint ventures and commercial partnerships. The division assesses business opportunities and engages partners that add value to the firm's portfolio. This division manages Dubai Parks and Resorts, Rove Hotels, Dubai Hills Estate, Dubai Water Canal, Caesars Bluewaters Dubai and Dubai Cruise Terminal.

Dubai Cruise Terminal
located in Dubai Harbour, will include two cruise terminals, capable of accommodating up to three cruise ships concurrently and up to 13,200 passengers.

Caesars Bluewaters Dubai 
A strategic partnership by Meraas and Caesars Entertainment Corporation to bring two luxury hotels, a beach club and theatre to the man-made island of Bluewaters Island

DXB Entertainments
The largest leisure and entertainment company in the region and the owners of Dubai Parks and Resorts, the region's largest integrated theme park destination which is responsible for the operation of Roxy Cinemas and Shooting Stars.

Rove Hotels 
A contemporary hospitality brand

Dubai Hills Estate 
A joint venture by Meraas and Emaar Properties, it is one of the largest master-planned communities in Dubai.

Dubai Water Canal 
Has been developed by Meraas, Meydan and the Roads and Transport Authority (Dubai), and is spread across 4 million square foot of land

Initiatives 
In 2018, Meraas launched Visit Hatta, an initiative which comprises an adventure and activity centre, and a number of resort properties.

The company is also responsible for implementing Hala China, a joint initiative by Meraas and Dubai Holding which is aligned with Dubai's Tourism Vision 2020 and aimed at enhancing economic and cultural exchange to drive investment cooperation between Dubai and China. The initiative seeks to attract Chinese visitors and investors to Dubai.

Meraas become part of Dubai Holding following a directive from Sheikh Mohammed bin Rashid Al Maktoum, Ruler of Dubai.

References

External links
 Meraas Holding website

2007 establishments in the United Arab Emirates
Conglomerate companies established in 2007
Property companies of the United Arab Emirates
Companies based in Dubai
Emirati brands